Trajectories was a 1980s tabloid magazine published in Austin, Texas by Richard Shannon and Susan Sneller. It featured news and articles on fantasy, science, science fantasy, science fiction, and science fiction philosophy. It contained reviews of books, poetry, short stories, music and performances. Articles and stories were contributed by Lewis Shiner2, John Shirley, Bruce Boston, Uncle River, Winter Damon and others. A total of six issues appeared irregularly over a six-year span.

Issue Contents

Trajectories 1
Cover by: Danny Giles. 
Interview w/: Lewis Shiner.
Stories by: G.K. Sprinkle, Theresa McGarry, F. Hupp, H.E. Peterson and CL Crouch. 
Steve Utley's Thrillaminute Comics pullout
Sam Hurt's Eyebeam comic strip

Trajectories 2
Cover by: Danny Giles
Howard Waldrop interviews Walter Simonson, 
Articles and Fiction by: Barbara MacLeod, Gen. Lee Natter, John Manning, Ronn Brasher, Bill Couvillion, Cl. Crouch.
Utley's Thrillaminute Comics.
Sam Hurt's Eyebeam comic strip.

Trajectories 3
Cover by: Nick Smith
John Manning interviews John Steakley
Articles and fiction by: John Manning, H.E. Peterson, Shirley Crossland, David Cameron, Susan Sneller, W.S. Wheeler, Pat Mueller, Michael Wright, Lewis Shiner and Rae Nadler.
Art by: Barrett, Roger Stewart, Alfred Klosterman, Lex Lequia, Mark Shaw
Sam Hurt's Eyebeam comic strips
Photos by: Carol Tripplet Smith, Gray Hawn, Melinda Spray, R.W. Shannon.

Trajectories 4
Interview with C. Dean Anderson
The Art of Denis Loubet
Fiction by: W.S. Wheeler, Floyd Largent, Suzanne Terrill, H.E. Peterson, Shirley Crossland, Susan Sneller and R.W. Shannon
Art by: Barrett. Eyebeam comics by Sam Hurt.

Trajectories 5
Cover by: Barrett
Lewis Shiner interviews Robert Anton Wilson
Fred Askew interviews Elizabeth Moon
Richard Shannon interviews Julias Kagerlitski
Articles and commentary by: John Shirley, Ann K. Schwader, Barbara MacLeod, Rick Shannon, Susan Sneller, Marge Simon, Bob Howe, W.S. Wheeler, H.E. Peterson, Uncle River, Don Webb, Mike Gunderloy
Poetry and fiction by: T. Winter Damon, Steve Schlich, Floyd Largent, W.S. Wheeler and Don Renfrew
Art by: Dell Harris, Barrett, Jean Elizabeth Martin, Alfred Klosterman
Comic by: Martin Wagner.

Trajectories 6
Cover by: Michael L. Barrett, 
Cecilia Nasti interviews Ilya Prigogene, 
Jane Branham Lynch interviews Chad Oliver,
Susan Sneller interviews Jaxon, 
Articles by: Marge Simon, Nowick Grey, H.E. Peterson, Susan Sneller, Richard Shannon, 
Poetry and fiction by: Marilyn K. Martin, Scott. E. Green, t. Winter Damon, Bruce Boston, Russ Williams, H.E. Peterson, Timothy Rucinsky, Betty McKinney, Tarry Faster, T.K. Murray, John Grey, and Uncle River.
Art by: Barrett, Nick Smith, Steven Fick, Michael Faison, Jaxon, H.E. Peterson, Bucky Montgomery, Barbara MacLeod 
Photos by: Jeff McMillian (Prigogene interview), Jane Branham Lynch and Howard Waldrop (Chad Oliver interview), 
Eyebeam comics by Sam Hurt

References

Why Publish? Mike Gunderloy (FactsheetFive), 1989, 54 pages, paperback - Available as e-zine download/online ; page 45: Category: Fate: Richard Shannon - Trajectories 
Science Fiction author Lewis Shiner website  
Under Short Stories: "Odd Man Out," Trajectories, Feb 1988.
Under Nonfiction: "Interview with Robert Anton Wilson," Trajectories, Winter 1989.

Defunct science fiction magazines published in the United States
Irregularly published magazines published in the United States
Magazines with year of establishment missing
Magazines with year of disestablishment missing
Magazines published in Austin, Texas
Speculative fiction magazines published in the United States